The Arena Lacrosse League (ALL) is a senior men's semi-professional box lacrosse league based in Canada. The league consists of teams in Ontario and British Columbia. Teams play a 14-game regular season schedule before league playoffs conclude with the ALL Cup.

History
Founded by Paul St. John in the summer of 2016, the ALL began with six teams for their first season in the winter of 2017. Oshawa Outlaws, Paris RiverWolves, Peterborough Timbermen, Six Nations Snipers, St. Catharines Shockwave and Toronto Monarchs were the original six of the ALL.

Oshawa Outlaws defeated the Toronto Monarchs 11-10 in the first league championship game played on April 9, 2017 at Tribute Communities Centre in Oshawa. The Outlaws were the regular season winner with a 10-4 record.

Season two included expansion with the Whitby Steelhawks. Toronto Monarchs finished with a league-best 11-3 regular season, but were eliminated in the semifinals by Whitby who would go on to capture the ALL Cup by defeating Paris RiverWolves 12-10 on April 8, 2018 at the Toronto Rock Athletic Centre.

In November of 2018 the ALL partnered with the National Lacrosse League. It will serve as a development league for the NLL.

Expansion in the west happened prior to the 2022 season when a four-team division was announced. All games to be played at the Langley Events Centre.

Women 
ALL added a women's division in 2018 with three teams (RiverWolves, Shockwave and Snipers) competing in the first season. All games are contested at the Iroquois Lacrosse Arena.

A fourth team (Steelhawks) was added for the 2019 season.

Teams

ALL Cup

References

External links
 Arena Lacrosse League

Professional sports leagues in Canada
Sports leagues established in 2016
2016 establishments in Ontario